Neil Anthony Burkett (born 16 March 1948) is a South African international lawn and indoor bowler.

Bowls career
Burkett won two World Bowls Championship medals; a fours bronze at the 1992 World Outdoor Bowls Championship in Worthing and a silver medal in the fours at the 2000 World Outdoor Bowls Championship in Johannesburg.

He has also won four Commonwealth Games medals including a gold medal in the fours at the 1994 Commonwealth Games in Victoria with Alan Lofthouse, Donald Piketh and Robert Rayfield.

In 1996, he won the Hong Kong International Bowls Classic pairs title with Gerry Baker.

References

External links
  (1994–2006)
 

1948 births
Living people
South African male bowls players
Commonwealth Games medallists in lawn bowls
Commonwealth Games gold medallists for South Africa
Commonwealth Games silver medallists for South Africa
Commonwealth Games bronze medallists for South Africa
Bowls players at the 1994 Commonwealth Games
Bowls players at the 1998 Commonwealth Games
Bowls players at the 2002 Commonwealth Games
Bowls players at the 2006 Commonwealth Games
Medallists at the 1994 Commonwealth Games
Medallists at the 1998 Commonwealth Games
Medallists at the 2002 Commonwealth Games
Medallists at the 2006 Commonwealth Games